Some of the first dwarfs to have their histories recorded were employed as court dwarfs. They were owned and traded amongst people of the court, and delivered as gifts to fellow kings and queens.

Visual effect
Court dwarfs were made to stand right next to the king or queen in a royal court during public appearances and ceremonies. Because they were so small, the king appeared much larger and visually enhanced his powerful position. Other than court jesters who were professional entertainers and clowns, court dwarfs were also used as "natural fools" to create amusement due to their unusual bodies. Their appearance also created allusions of mythology and magic like kobolds and wights.

Antiquity

Ancient Egypt, Greece, and Rome

From the earliest historic times dwarfs attracted attention, and there was much competition on the part of kings and the wealthy to obtain dwarfs as attendants. Ancient Egypt saw dwarfs as being people with significant sacred associations, so owning a dwarf gave a person high social stature.

China
Sima Qian wrote of court dwarfs. He wrote about You Zan, a court dwarf under the "First Emperor of Qin" who reigned from 259 to 210 B.C.E. In one passage he described You taking pity on guards standing in the rain outside a banquet. It is said that the emperor overheard You's conversation with them and ordered a changing of the guards so that they could rest inside.  

Martin Monestier claims that the Emperor Xuanzong constructed a "Resting Place for Desirable Monsters" where dwarfs were included among the "monsters." Emperor Wu Di, who reigned during the Western Han Dynasty, imported numerous dwarfs to act as slaves and jesters. Yang Cheng, a provincial governor, intervened to help them. He told the emperor that little people were his subjects rather than slaves and should be treated as such. Wu Di was moved and released the dwarfs. Yang Cheng was deified and worshipped by some of their families. Yang Cheng's image was worshipped for centuries. The practice of keeping court dwarfs persisted as well.  

Chinese emperors were able to import dwarfs via the Silk Road. This practice persisted at least until the Tang Dynasty.

Modern era in Europe
As the courts of Europe were constantly competing not only in politics but also in terms of representation, the rulers and nobles tried to command as many dwarfs as possible. Natalya Alexeyevna of Russia, a sister of Tsar Peter the Great, was recorded to have 93 court dwarfs while the Spanish royal court housed 70 dwarfs in the time from 1563 to 1700. People with dwarfism were recruited from all over Europe and were used as a popular gift to other rulers.

While jesters were often only temporarily present at a specific court, dwarfs usually had a permanent function and were registered in the personnel rolls as "court dwarf", "personal dwarf" or "chamber dwarf". This enabled them to play an important role in ceremonial culture and gave them close access to the ruler. This close relationship led to multiple roles beyond the foolish task as a natural clown. Court dwarfs served as a substitute for children or even diplomats. At the end of their career, these privileged dwarfs would usually receive a pension and other benefits. A favourite dwarf of Peter the Great received a state funeral including miniature horses and a "small priest".

France
He began life as a servant in the Orleans family. In later years he was their pensioner. He is said to have been put to strange use in the French Revolution—passing in and out of Paris as an infant in a nurse's arms, but with despatches, dangerous to carry, in Richebourg's baby-wrappings. He died in Paris in 1846, at the age of 90.

Great Britain
British tradition has its earliest dwarf mentioned in the old ballad which begins "In Arthur's court Tom Thumb did live";  and on this evidence the prototype of the modern Tom Thumb is alleged to have lived at the court of King Edgar. Of authentic English dwarfs, the first appears to be John Jarvis , who was a page to Queen Mary I. Her brother King Edward VI had his dwarf called Xit.

A dwarf at the court of James VI and I, Christian Steward, was given £20 in 1616 for her journey to Scotland. The first English dwarf of whom there is anything like an authentic history is Jeffrey Hudson (1619–1682). He was the son of a butcher at Oakham, Rutland, who kept and baited bulls for George Villiers, 1st Duke of Buckingham. Neither of Jeffrey's parents was undersized, yet at nine years he measured scarcely  though he was gracefully proportioned. At a dinner given by the Duke to Charles I and his queen he was brought in to table in a pie out of which he stepped, and was at once adopted by Queen Henrietta Maria. The little fellow followed the fortunes of the court in the English Civil War, and is said to have been a captain of horse, earning the nickname of "strenuous Jeffrey" for his activity.

He fought two duels—one with a turkey-cock, a battle recorded by Davenant, and a second with Mr Crofts, who came to the meeting with a squirt gun, but who in the more serious encounter which ensued was shot dead by little Hudson, who fired from horseback, the saddle putting him on a level with his antagonist. Twice was Jeffrey made prisoner—once by the Dunkirkers as he was returning from France, whither he had been on homely business for the Queen; the second time was when he fell into the hands of Turkish pirates. At the Restoration, he returned to England, where he lived on a pension granted him by the Duke of Buckingham. He was later accused of participation in the Popish Plot and was imprisoned in the Gate House. He was released and shortly after died at the age of 63.

Contemporary with Hudson were the two other dwarfs of Henrietta Maria, Richard Gibson and his wife Anne. They were married by the Queen's wish; and the two together measured only  They had nine children, five of whom, who lived, were of ordinary stature. Edmund Waller celebrated the nuptials, Evelyn designated the husband as the "compendium of a man", and Lely painted them hand in hand. Gibson was miniature painter to Charles I, and drawing-master to the daughters of James II, Queens Mary II and Anne, when they were children. Gibson was from Cumberland and began his career as a page, first in a "gentle", next in the royal family, died in 1690, in his seventy-fifth year, and is buried in St Paul's, Covent Garden. The last court dwarf in England was Coppernin, who was in the service of the princess (Augusta) of Wales, the mother of George III. The last dwarf retainer in a gentleman's family was the one kept by Mr Beckford, the author of Vathek and builder of Fonthill Abbey. He was rather too big to be flung from one guest to another, as used to be the custom at dinners in earlier days when a dwarf was a "necessity" for every noble family.

Poland

Court dwarfs existed in Poland from at least the 16th century, when the Polish princesses Catherine Jagiellon and Sophia Jagiellon both had court dwarf of their own Agnieszka (courtier) and Dorothea Ostrelska, who accompanied them to Sweden and Germany respectively when they left Poland to marry.

Court dwarfs were still in existence at the Polish court during the 18th century, when they had become unfashionable in other courts. Stanislas of Poland owned Nicolas Ferry ("Bébé") (1741–1764), who measured . He was one of three dwarf children of peasant parents in the Vosges. He died in 1764, at the age of 24.

Spain

The Spanish Royal Court was famed for its court dwarfs, and employed many during the 16th and 17th centuries.  Of European court dwarfs, the most famous were those of Philip IV of Spain, the hunchbacks whose features have been painted by Diego Velázquez.  One of them was Maria Bárbola, who was employed as Enana de la Reina, the official dwarf of the queen, between 1651 and 1700.  She was far from the only one, and the Queen's Household employed several, among them Juana de Aunon, the sisters Genoveva and Catalina Bazan and Bernarda Blasco.  They had a privileged position with their own servants, and acted as playmates of the royal children.

The era of the court dwarfs in Spain ended in the year of 1700, when the new king Philip V of Spain modernized the Spanish Royal Court by abolishing several posts he deemed outdated and was by then unfashionable in other parts of Europe, such as jesters, fools and court dwarfs.

Sweden

Court dwarfs are noted at the Swedish Royal Court from the mid 16th-century, when the female court dwarfs "Lilla Gunnel" ('Little Gunnel') and Fedossa from Russia were in service of Princess Sophia of Sweden.

The Polish princess Catherine Jagiellon (1526–1583), married to the Swedish John III, duke of Finland and later king of Sweden, had a close confidante in Dorothea Ostrelska, a dwarf woman.  Dosieczka, as she was known, was one of the only members of Catherine's entourage that she kept with her while imprisoned by king Eric XIV of Sweden as a result of her husband, the king's brother, rebelling against the crown.  Dosieczka was a favorite and confidante of Catherine also after the latter became queen of Sweden.

Court dwarfs were a part of the Swedish Royal Court during the entire 17th-century, often as jesters, and several are noted, such as "Narrinnan Elisabet" ('Elisabet the Female Jester'), employed with queen Maria Eleonora, Annika Kollberg (or 'Little Midget Annika') employed with queen Hedvig Eleonora,  and Anders Luxemburg with Charles XII of Sweden.

The court dwarfs were normally not given wages but only clothing, food and room: however, in individual cases some of them, such as the African court dwarf Carl Ulrich, could be given schooling and training in a proper occupation and formally employed as chamber servants or stable boys and thus given proper wages, and at least one, Anders Been, was ennobled.  The position of court dwarf became unfashionable after the reign of Charles XII.

List of people with the position of court dwarf

 Nano Morgante, Italian court dwarf in the court of Cosimo I de' Medici, Grand Duke of Tuscany
 Agnieszka (courtier), Polish court dwarf in service of Sophia Jagiellon, Duchess of Brunswick-Lüneburg 
 Maria Bárbola, Spanish court dwarf
 Anders Been, Norwegian painter and court dwarf in service of the Swedish queen dowager Hedwig Eleonora of Holstein-Gottorp
 François de Cuvilliés, originally court dwarf of Maximilian II Emanuel, Elector of Bavaria
 Nicolas Ferry (known as Bébé) (1741–1764), French dwarf of King Stanisław Leszczyński
 Helena Antonia, court dwarf of Maria of Austria, Holy Roman Empress
 Jeffrey Hudson (1619 – ) court dwarf of the English queen Henrietta Maria of France
Józef Boruwłaski (1739 – 1837), Polish-born court dwarf and musician who toured in European and Turkish courts
 Perkeo of Heidelberg, court dwarf of Elector Palatine Charles III Philip in Heidelberg

Gallery

See also
Kammermohr

References

Further reading
 

Attribution

External links
 

People with dwarfism
Obsolete occupations
Dwarf